Sinan Selen (born 1972) is a German jurist and the Vice-President of the German Federal Office for the Protection of the Constitution (BfV). Selen is the first high-ranking officer with a migrant background in the German intelligence services.

Early life and education 
Selen was born in Istanbul to secular parents. At the age of four, he and his parents moved to Cologne, where his parents were journalists at the German broadcaster Deutsche Welle. In high school he wrote for the students' journal. He was also involved as a paramedic with the St. John ambulance service. He studied European law at the University of Cologne.

Career 
In 2000 Selen began his career at the Federal Criminal Police Office where he was assigned to the security detail of Chancellor Gerhard Schröder and Minister of the Interior Otto Schily. After the terrorist attacks on the twin towers in New York on 11 September 2001 he searched for traces of evidence that the attackers left in Germany. In July 2006 he organized the hunt for two Lebanese terrorists who placed two bombs on regional trains at the Cologne main station. The attack failed as the bombs did not explode. After an extensive review of videos from surveillance cameras, one of the perpetrators was captured in the train station in Kiel. Afterwards, his accomplice in Lebanon surrendered as well. 

Selen entered the Ministry of the Interior in 2006, and initially his work was focused on the ban of the Salafist organization Millatu Ibrahim. He served as the head of the international counter-terrorism department until 2009. Between 2009 and 2012 he was assigned to the Headquarters of the Federal Police in the counter-piracy and human trafficking department. From 2012 onwards he worked in the Ministry of the Interior where in early 2016 he was given the task to coordinate between Turkey and Germany on terror-related issues. As a result, he and the diplomat Emily Haber often travelled to Ankara, Turkey. In their conversations with the Turkish authorities, he refused to extradite members of the Gülen movement, and conversed through a translator in the German language most of the time. 

From 2016 Selen was in charge of security for the travel agency TUI. In January 2019 he assumed the role of Vice President of the Federal Office for the Protection of the Constitution (BfV), succeeding Thomas Haldenwang who was appointed president of the BfV.

Reception 
Selen's appointment to the vice-presidency of the BfV caused concerns across the political spectrum. The left was worried that he would cause difficulties for Kurdish sympathizers of the Kurdistan Workers Party (PKK) and left-wing Turkish political activists, while the right accused him of being a Muslim, which he actually is not. The Greens welcomed his appointment.

References 

1972 births
Living people
German civil servants
Turkish diaspora
University of Cologne alumni
German jurists
Paramedics
Jurists from Cologne
Turkish diaspora in Germany